Manrent refers to a Scottish contract of the mid-15th century to the early 17th century, usually military in nature and involving Scottish clans. The bond of manrent was commonly an instrument in which a weaker man or clan pledged to serve, in return for protection, a stronger lord or clan—in effect becoming a vassal that renders service to a superior, often made in the form of a covenant. Manrents were a Promise by one person to serve another, [such] that he shall be friend to all his friends, and foe to all his foes.

Some bonds of manrent, described as bonds of friendship, took place between men or clans of equal power, worded in the form of treaties of offensive and defensive alliance. These contracting parties bound themselves to assist each other. Manrents always acknowledged and prioritized the signatory's duty of allegiance to the King, in terms such as: "…always excepting duty to our lord the king". In the same manner, when men who were not chiefs of clans, but of subordinate tribes, thus bound themselves, their fidelity to their chiefs was always excepted, in terms such as "…always excepting duty to our kindred and friends".

Smaller clans, unable to defend themselves, and clans or families who had lost their chiefs, frequently entered into manrent. Under such treaties, smaller clans identified themselves with the greater clans. They engaged in the quarrels, followed the fortunes, and fought under the greater chiefs. However, their ranks were separately marshaled, and led by their own subordinate chiefs, chieftains, lairds or captains, who owed submission only when necessary, for the success of combined operations. Although manrents often used terms such as, "our successors", "perpetually", and "in all time coming", their object was usually defense, aggression, or revenge, rarely extending further than the occasion for which they were formed.

Background

Bonds of manrent played an important part in Scottish clan relationships from the 15th to the early 17th century. Disputes between opposing clans were frequently made matters of negotiation, with differences often settled by treaties. To strengthen a clan against a rival, or to maintain the balance of power in a region, a clan could join a coalition with friendly neighbours. Manrents protected smaller clans from being swallowed up by larger ones, and nursed the turbulent and warlike spirit that formed the common distinction of all. From these and other causes, the Highlands were, for ages, as constant a theater of petty conflicts that paralleled larger ones in Europe. The circumstances that led to manrents show that the Scottish government of the time was too weak to protect the oppressed or quell disputes between clans.

Manrents and Scots Law

Manrents were abolished by Act of Parliament, Edinburgh, under legislation on 6 March 1457 "that no man dwelling within burgh be found in manrent", and under the same terms, by legislation on 18 May 1491. The penalty being the confiscation of goods and "thar lifis at the kingis will". However, the terms of this legislation allowed for Manrents to the King, to the King's officers, to the Lord of the same burgh as the man entering into manrent, and to their superior officer.

In Chapter 17 of legislation on 20 June 1555, and for reasons "because it is thocht aganis all law and obedience of subjectis towart thair princis", the giving and taking of bonds of manrent made in the past were now null and void, an exception was made for heritable bonds given for "assythment of slaughters in time bygone".

Manrents mentioned in Parliamentary procedure and legislation:

 Under parliamentary procedure of 11 December 1543, Sir James Hamilton, was bound into a bond of manrent for himself and his heirs to James Hamilton, Earl of Arran and his heirs, in return for a bond of maintenance.
 A "Ratification of a bond of manrent to [James Weir], laird of Blackwood" was passed in legislation 5 June 1592, "for the assythment and satisfactioun of the slauchter of umquhile Johnne Weir of Poneill".

The following cases involving bonds of manrent were brought before the Judicial proceedings: acts of the lords auditors of causes and complaints:

 4 July 1476, Gavin of Crichton against Sir William of Borthwick, knight
 20 July 1476, Alexander Cunningham, Lord Kilmaurs, against Robert of Muir of Rowallan
 9 December 1482, John the Bruce of the Stenhouse against Robert Fleming, Lord Fleming and Andrew Oliphant, his bailie
 19 May 1491, Cuthbert of Murray of Cockpool against Robert of Carlyle

Terminology

The earliest known bond to use the term "manrent" was recorded in January 1442, between Alexander MacDonald, earl of Ross and Hugh Fraser of Lovat. Earlier contracts survive, but use terms such as "letters of retinue" or "rentinencia".

Illustrative example of a manrent

In 1588, William Macleod of Macleod, 13th chief of Clan Macleod, entered into a bond of manrent with Lachlan Mackintosh of Mackintosh, Captain and Chief of the Clan Chattan, whose daughter he had married, in
the following terms (text taken from public domain):-

List of manrents (currently incomplete)

See also
 Coalition
 Covenant (law) 
 Homage (medieval)
 Scottish clan
 Treaty

Notes

References

 
 
 
 
 
 
 

Medieval law
Scots law
 Manrent